Cwmbran bus station is a bus terminus and interchange located in the town centre of Cwmbran, South Wales.

Background 
The station was commissioned along with the wider development of the town of Cwmbran in August 1949, following the end of the Second World War. The UK embarked on a series of new towns in order to meet high demand for housing and employment, particularly in war ravaged communities.

Under the New Towns Act 1946, Cwmbran became the first New Town in Wales. A body, Cwmbran Development Corporation, was created to oversee work. A 55-acre town centre was designed, and the bus station was the key interchange for both the retail and residential area.

Layout 
The bus station diverts from the circular Glyndwr Road around the town, just after the roundabout on St David's Road.

The station has eight bus stands, identified with letters A-H.

It is surrounded by the retail centre, Cwmbran Centre, and opposite is the newer Leisure @ Cwmbran development which includes restaurants, a bowling centre, and a cinema.

Destinations 
Cwmbran is the terminus for a number of Stagecoach services due to the local depot in the town, and serves as an interchange for travellers headed north or south.

*21 bus continues from Pontypool to Cwmbran most hours.

Connecting transport 
Cwmbran railway station provides rail transport to destinations on the Welsh Marches line, including Cardiff Central, Newport, Manchester, Maesteg, Swansea, Carmarthen, and Milford Haven. The station is a seven-minute walk from the bus station.

The area also has a large number of car parking facilities, some included in the shopping centre, as well as around the town.

See also
 List of bus stations in Wales
 Transport in Wales

References 

Bus stations in Wales
Buildings and structures in Torfaen